At least three warships of Japan have been named Hayashio:

, a  launched in 1939 and sunk in 1942.
, a  launched in 1961 and struck in 1977.
, a  launched in 1991 and struck in 2011.

Japanese Navy ship names
Japan Maritime Self-Defense Force ship names